Here We Go is the second extended play album by Australian punk/rock band 28 Days. It was released in February 2000 and peaked at number 21 on the ARIA Charts. The track "Sucker" received radio promotional release.

Track listing

Charts

Release history

References

2000 EPs
EPs by Australian artists
28 Days (band) albums